Ponerorchis thailandica is a species of flowering plant in the family Orchidaceae, native to northern Thailand.

Taxonomy
The species was first described in 1997 as Amitostigma thailandicum. A molecular phylogenetic study in 2014 found that species of Amitostigma, Neottianthe and Ponerorchis were mixed together in a single clade, making none of the three genera monophyletic as then circumscribed. Amitostigma and Neottianthe were subsumed into Ponerorchis, with this species becoming Ponerorchis thailandica.

References

thailandica
Flora of Thailand
Plants described in 2014